ESSU or Essu may refer to:

 Eastern Samar State University, a university in the Philippines
 Essu, a village in Estonia
 Espoon Suunta (EsSu), an orienteering club from Espoo, Finland
 Eskilstuna Airport, Sweden (by ICAO code)